Captina is an unincorporated community in Belmont County, in the U.S. state of Ohio.

History
A post office was in operation at Captina from 1816 until 1907. The community took its name from nearby Captina Creek.

References

Unincorporated communities in Belmont County, Ohio
1816 establishments in Ohio
Populated places established in 1816
Unincorporated communities in Ohio